I Am Hardstyle (previously known as WE R Music) is a Dutch record label which produces hardstyle. The label was founded in 2013 by Fabian Bohn, better known by his stage name, Brennan Heart.

Artists 
Artists currently associated with I Am Hardstyle/ WE R Music:
ANDY SVGE
Audiotricz
Brennan Heart
Blademasterz
Code Black
Concept Art (I Am Hardstyle Amplify, previously WE R Music/Detailed Traxx)
Clockartz
Dailucia
Rebourne
The Pitcher
TAC Team (project of Toneshifterz, Atmozfears, and Code Black)
Thyron
Toneshifterz
Wildfyre
Xense (I Am Hardstyle Amplify, previously X-Bone/Detailed Traxx)
Zero Days (I Am Hardstyle Amplify, previously Detailed Traxx)

Artists previously associated with I Am Hardstyle/ WE R Music:
Aftershock (WE R Music/I Am Hardstyle, now Art of Creation)
Aztech (WE R Tomorrow)
Crisis Era (WE R Tomorrow, now Detailed Traxx)
Firelite (WE R Music, now Dirty Workz)
Final Form (WE R Music)
Focuz (WE R Tomorrow)
Galactixx (WE R Music, now Roughstate)
Outbreak (WE R Raw)
Sub Sonik (WE R Raw, now Dirty Workz)
The Vision (WE R Music)
TWSTD (WE R Raw, now Triplex Records)
Uncaged (WE R Raw, currently active)

Releases

As WE R Music

External links 
Official Website
I Am Hardstyle on Soundcloud
WE R Music on Soundcloud

References 

Dutch record labels
Electronic dance music record labels